Gwyn Martin DFM (1921–2001) was a Welsh photographer and pharmacist. He was born in the Rhondda in 1921 and died in 2001 in Aberystwyth.

Wartime experience
Gwyn Martin was still at school when he enlisted with the Royal Air Force (RAF) at the outbreak of the Second World War in September 1939.

After completing his training at No. 15 Operational Training Unit as a navigator in April 1941, he joined No. 75 Squadron RAF at RAF Feltwell flying the Vickers Wellington bomber.

Three months and 20 missions later he was awarded the Distinguished Flying Medal after a daylight bombing of the docks at Brest inflicting further damage to the German battleship Gneisenau. His aircraft Wellington 1457 "P" was severely damaged with repeated attacks by four ME109's. Pilot Officer Curry returned the damaged aircraft for a high speed crash landing at Boscombe Down without wheels or flaps.

Martin finished his first "tour" before his 20th birthday and spent the next six months at No. 12 Operational Training Unit as a Check Navigator / Bomb Aimer before returning for a second "tour" in May 1942 with a posting to No. 150 Squadron RAF at RAF Snaith.

In October 1942, on the day after his 21st birthday, Wellington BK.309 "N" was on a minelaying mission in Haugesund. The aircraft was hit by flak and severely damaged while flying at 600 feet at night. Pilot Officer Ken Rees managed to ditch the burning aircraft in a small inland lake (Langavatnet / Tysvaer) (The wreckage of the aircraft were discovered by Martin during a visit to Norway in 1964 along with the remains of the rear gunner).

Flight Sergeant Don Taylor and Flight Sergeant Harry Dalziel were killed while the rest of the crew were captured and spent the next two and a half years as prisoners of war in Stalag Luft III near Zagan in Poland. In January 1945 he was among the prisoners force marched in Arctic conditions over 100 km to Spremberg then Luckenwalde where he was liberated by the Russians.

Post-war activities
After his release from the RAF, Martin entered university and in 1948, qualified as a pharmacist.

In 1946 he married Jane Marjorie Lloyd from Aberystwyth and they both ran "Taylor Lloyd, the Chemists", in Great Darkgate Street, Aberystwyth, until their retirement.

A keen rugby player, Gwyn Martin played for Cardiff RFC, Aberavon and Llanelli, and while a student, appeared in the Welsh Final Trials of 1946–7. He was Captain of Aberystwyth RFC between 1948 and 1951 and President from 1982 onwards. He was a founder member of Aberystwyth RAFA and elected a life member.  For 18 years he was the Honorary Secretary of the Aberystwyth branch of the RNLI and then became their President. 

In 1989 Martin published his "partial" autobiography entitled Up and Under which detailed his war years and the time he spent as a POW at what he called the "University of Life" in Stalag Luft III.

Photography
It is as an enthusiastic and distinguished photographer that he is best remembered; he was President of Aberystwyth Camera Club from 1958 onwards.

Lindy and David Martin have published a book in 2004 of a nostalgic look at some of the changes that have taken place in Aberystwyth through the eyes of their father, in which many of his photographs are to be found, entitled A Stroll Around the Harbour.

Following his death his collection of photographs has been placed in the National Library of Wales in Aberystwyth.

Gwyn Martin supplied the photographs of local Aberystwyth RFC supporters to illustrate a book containing 30 popular rugby songs called "Sosban Fach" which was published in 1987.

References

External links
 RAF Feltwell Personnel Memorial Pages
 A Profile on Gwyn Martin with Photo selection
75(NZ) Squadron Website

1921 births
2001 deaths
British pharmacists
British World War II prisoners of war
Recipients of the Distinguished Flying Medal
Royal Air Force officers
Royal Air Force personnel of World War II
Rugby union players from Penygraig
Stalag Luft III prisoners of World War II
Welsh photographers
Welsh rugby union players